Pumham (died 1676) (also known as Pomham) was one of Metacomet's chief advisors during King Phillip's War. He was sachem of Shawomet. He was described as "one of the stoutest and most valiant sachems that belonged to the Narragansett." He was friends with English settlers, but aligned himself with Metacomet when war broke out.

Early life
Pumham was allied with the Massachusetts Bay colony, who claimed the lands of Shawomet, today Warwick, Rhode Island. The colony forbid anyone to live there without permission, and built a fort there to protect the area, the remains of which were still visible in 2000. This fort was built on the site of Pumham's village.

King Phillip's War

As tensions mounted, Pumham began encouraging defiance, and not peace, with the colonists. During the war, Pumham used the fort Shawomet.

On July 4, 1675, Governor John Leverett sent Edward Hutchinson to sign a treaty with the Narragansets whereby they would agree not to harbor any of  Metacomet's people. Hutchinson decided "to treat with the Narragansets sword in hand," and forced Pumham to sign on July 15. Pumham and his people ignored the treaty as soon as the colonists left.  

Pumham was captured in Dedham, Massachusetts on July 25, 1676. Several Christian Indians had seen his band in the woods, including his son and other family members, nearly starved to death. Captain Samuel Hunting led 36 men from Dedham and Medfield and joined 90 Indians on a hunt to find them. A total of 15 of the Ponham's band were killed and 35 were captured. Pumham, with a bullet in his back and so wounded he could not stand, hid in the bushes with this hatchet. He grabbed hold of an English soldier and would have killed him had one of the settler's compatriots not come to his rescue. Pumham died in the fight.

Notes

References

Works cited

 

Year of birth unknown
1676 deaths
King Philip's War
Native American leaders
Wampanoag people
Native American history of Massachusetts